Jamuni Lal College, commonly known as JL College, is a college in Hajipur in the Indian state of Bihar. It is a constituent college of Babasaheb Bhimrao Ambedkar Bihar University, Muzaffarpur in October 1980. This government college  is in Hajipur, Bihar, India.

References

Universities and colleges in Bihar
Universities and colleges in Vaishali district
Education in Hajipur
Educational institutions established in 1969
1969 establishments in Bihar